Métier, Limited is a project portfolio management (PPM) company founded in 1998. Métier develops project portfolio management (PPM) software. The company is headquartered in Healdsburg, California.

Company
Métier develops, manufacturers and maintains proprietary project portfolio management software.  Métier's project portfolio management software was formerly known as PPM Central, and before that, was known as WorkLenz. It uses the HTML5 technology.

The Taxonomy tool is an additional functionality, which allows users to explore and navigate their portfolio. The taxonomic structure provides a method for analyzing and reporting on organizational big data.  The integrated toolset allows users to derive reports at all levels of the Taxonomy. Métier is using natural language processing to improve project and project portfolio management.

WorkLenz 
WorkLenz was a web based project portfolio management application with no active controls and no persistent cookies. It was built on the .NET Framework and was available in two delivery methods: self-hosted or software as a service (SaaS). WorkLenz enabled the select, control and evaluate process for enterprise software projects and investments.

References

External links
 

1998 establishments in California
American companies established in 1998
Software companies established in 1998
Software companies based in the San Francisco Bay Area
Companies based in Sonoma County, California
Companies based in Arlington County, Virginia
Healdsburg, California
Defunct software companies of the United States